On 12 February 2013, North Korean state media announced it had conducted an underground nuclear test, its third in seven years. A tremor that exhibited a nuclear bomb signature with an initial magnitude 4.9 (later revised to 5.1) was detected by the China Earthquake Networks Center, Preparatory Commission for the Comprehensive Nuclear-Test-Ban Treaty Organization and the United States Geological Survey. In response, Japan summoned an emergency United Nations meeting for 12 February and South Korea raised its military alert status. It is not known whether the explosion was nuclear or a conventional explosion designed to mimic a nuclear blast; as of two days after the blast, Chinese, Japanese, and South Korean investigators had failed to detect any radiation.

Test 

On 12 February 2013, a spokesman for North Korea's army command said it had successfully conducted a third underground nuclear weapons test, according to the Yonhap. North Korea also said the test had used a miniaturized nuclear device with greater explosive power.

Before North Korea announced they had conducted the test, seismic activity had already been detected in North Korea by the United States Geological Survey (USGS) and the seismic network operated by the Comprehensive Nuclear-Test-Ban Treaty Organization (CTBTO) Preparatory Commission, near the site of previous nuclear tests at Mantapsan in Kilju County. A large tremor, first estimated at magnitude of 4.9, was detected in North Korea, and governments in the region were trying to determine whether it was a third nuclear test. The tremor occurred at 11:57am KST (2:57am UTC), and the USGS said the hypocenter of the event was only one kilometer deep.

Later, the Geophysical Service of the Russian Academy of Sciences assures the residents in the Russian Far East that the nuclear blast did not trigger any seismic events and underground tremors at 16:00 local time on 12 February 2013 in the area and thus the North Korea's nuclear test does not pose danger to the residents there.

The China Earthquake Networks Center (Abbreviation: CENC) also reported this event, putting the magnitude at Ms 4.9. The tremor caused by the test could be felt by residents of the neighboring city of Hunchun and Antu, in Yanbian, Jilin Province, China. The explosion was registered by 94 seismic stations and two infrasound stations in the CTBTO's global monitoring system. The CTBTO radionuclide network later made a significant detection of radioactive noble gases that could be attributed to the nuclear test.

Yield estimates 
South Korea's defense ministry said the event reading indicated a blast of 6–7 kilotons, later revised to 6–9 kilotons using the Comprehensive Nuclear Test Ban Treaty Organization's calculation method.

The Korea Institute of Geosciences and Mineral Resources estimated the yield as 7.7–7.8 kilotons while the Japanese put the estimation between 8 and 10 kilotons.

Some experts estimate the yield to be up to 15 kilotons, since the test site's geology is not well understood. The Russian Defence Ministry said the power of North Korea's nuclear test blast "surpassed 7 kilotons".

NORSAR compared the seismic data from all three North Korean nuclear tests and estimated the yield of the 2013 test as approximately 10 kilotons.

The Federal Institute for Geosciences and Natural Resources, a state-run geology research institute in Germany, estimated the yield initially at 40 kilotons. However, this estimation has since been revised to  after the January 2016 North Korean nuclear test was conducted.

On 19 June 2013, the University of Science and Technology of China released a report that claimed that they had found the precise location of the test at latitude 41°17′26.88″, longitude 129°4′34.68″, with an error margin of 94 meters and the yield at around 12.2 kt, with a margin of error of 3.8 kt.

In comparison, the fission nuclear bombs dropped by the Enola Gay on Hiroshima (Little Boy, a "gun-type" nuclear bomb) and on Nagasaki by Bockscar (Fat Man, an "implosion-type" nuclear bomb) had blast yield equivalences of 16 and 21 kilotons respectively.

Further tests 
On 4 February 2013, a South Korean military official had stated that there was a "chance that the southern tunnel is a decoy, but we are not ruling out that the regime will conduct nuclear tests simultaneously at both tunnels". On 15 February 2013, North Korea had told China that they were preparing for one or two more nuclear tests that year. On 8 April 2013, South Korea had observed activity at Punggye-ri, suggesting that a fourth underground test was being prepared. It was later believed that the tunneling activity that started in April was for a long-term project, and that a nuclear test wouldn't occur soon.

According to a U.S. expert, North Korea has everything in place for a fourth explosion but is hesitating due to the fear that it would anger China. A professor from Georgetown University predicted that test would occur in spring 2014 at latest.

On 17 December 2013, a member of South Korea's parliamentary intelligence committee said that a nuclear and missile test would occur soon to draw attention away from the execution of Jang Sung-taek. This was said after North Korea floated propaganda leaflets to South Korea that threatened the annihilation of Baengnyeongdo.

On 22 April 2014, South Korea reported that North Korea had stepped up its activity at its main nuclear test site, meaning they may be preparing for their fourth underground nuclear test. The United States urged North Korea to refrain from testing.

On 6 January 2016 North Korea says it has successfully carried out a hydrogen bomb test, which if confirmed, will be a first for the reclusive regime and a significant advancement for its military ambitions.
The test took place at 10a.m. local time, the regime said in a televised statement. The seismic event, which measured the event at a magnitude of 5.1, occurred 19 kilometers (12 miles) east-northeast of Sungjibaegam, the United States Geological Survey said. A senior U.S. administration told CNN it could take days to obtain the scientific data to determine whether this was a successful test.

Reactions 
In response, Japan's Prime Minister, Shinzo Abe, called an urgent security meeting of the United Nations Security Council. The emergency session was to be held 9am EST on 12 February 2013. Tibor Toth, executive secretary of the Comprehensive Nuclear-Test-Ban Treaty Organization Preparatory Commission (CTBTO), confirmed the event's location was "roughly congruent with" nuclear tests carried out by North Korea in 2006 and 2009. Japan's Kyodo News service reported the Japanese defense ministry had scrambled aircraft to hunt for radiation effects. Japan's government held a national security council meeting in Tokyo according to NHK. The South Korean military also raised its readiness level. In general, international reactions to the 2013 North Korean nuclear test have been almost uniformly negative.

See also 
 2013 in North Korea
 Foreign relations of North Korea
 List of nuclear weapons tests of North Korea
 North Korea and weapons of mass destruction
 North Korean withdrawal from the Korean Armistice Agreement – post reaction to the nuclear test by North Korea, South Korea and the United States
 UN Resolution 2094

References 

Nuclear test
2013
Underground nuclear weapons testing
February 2013 events in Asia